Israël was a trilingual weekly Zionist magazine which was headquartered in Cairo, Egypt. It existed between 1920 and 1939 and was published in three language editions: Arabic, French and Hebrew.

History and profile
Israël was established by Albert Mosseri in Cairo in 1920. It was the official media outlet of Ha Shomer ha Zair, a Jewish organization. The magazine had three language editions, Arabic, French and Hebrew all which were started on 2 April 1920. Albert Mosseri also edited the French edition of the magazine until his death in 1933. His assistant editors were Albert Staraselski and Joseph Mosseri. The Arabic edition was edited by three different individuals, Murad Faraj, Yousef Manufla and Saad Yaqub Maliki. Mathilde Mosseri, wife of Albert Mosseri, edited the Hebrew edition together with Yehoshua Kantrovich. Following the death of her husband Mathilde Mosseri edited the French edition of magazine in the period 1933–1939. 

Israël was published on a weekly basis. As of 1920 the magazine was distributed to several regions, including Palestine, Damascus, Beirut, Paris, Baghdad, Cyprus, Basra, Brussels, England and Thessaloniki. Due to tensions about the Palestine issue the magazine was banned in Iraq in September 1933.

The Hebrew edition of the magazine was closed down in 1923, and its Arabic edition ceased publication in 1933. The French edition was folded in 1939.

The magazine had an explicitly Zionist editorial line.

References

External links
 Article on the paper with links to scans from the National Library of Israel

1920 establishments in Egypt
1939 disestablishments in Egypt
Arabic-language magazines
French-language magazines
Jewish magazines
Magazines published in Cairo
Magazines established in 1920
Magazines disestablished in 1939
Defunct political magazines published in Egypt
Weekly magazines published in Egypt
Defunct newspapers published in Egypt
Defunct weekly newspapers
Newspapers established in 1920
Newspapers published in Cairo
Publications disestablished in 1939
Jews and Judaism in Cairo
Zionism in Egypt